Kaasiku may refer to several places in Estonia:

Kaasiku, Harju County, village in Kernu Parish, Harju County
Kaasiku, Hiiu County, village in Käina Parish, Hiiu County
Kaasiku, Jõgeva County, village in Kasepää Parish, Jõgeva County
Kaasiku, Lääne County, village in Martna Parish, Lääne County